is a Japanese manga artist from Atsugi, Kanagawa Prefecture.

She wrote the manga series Miracle Girls, Loving You, and Ultra Cute. Loving You won the Nakayoshi Best New Artist Award.

List of works

 Hanamaru Company (花まるカンパニー)
 Peanuts Avenue (Pなつ通り)
 Miracle Girls (ミラクル☆ガールズ)
 Tenshi ni KISS (天使にKISS)
 Mighty Angel (マイティーエンジェル)
 Mezase! Manga Daioh (めざせ!マンガ大王)
 Snow Drop (スノードロップ)
 Mille Fleurs (ミル・フルール)
 Kono Ao ni Koi wo Shita (この青に恋をした)
 Kokoro made Idaite (心まで抱いて)
 Ultra Cute (うるきゅー)
 Virgin Lesson (バージン・レッスン)
 Venus Project (ヴィーナス・プロジェクト)
 Puri ☆ Hani (プリ☆ハニ)

collaboration work
 Nude na Onna (ヌードな女~蒼井そら物語) (art by Sola Aoi)

References

External links
Akimoto Nami

Manga artists from Kanagawa Prefecture
Living people
1968 births